UAAP Season 55 is the 1992–93 athletic year of the University Athletic Association of the Philippines. This season was hosted by the University of Santo Tomas.

Men's basketball
The UAAP men's basketball competition opens on July 18 at the Araneta Coliseum. The year's host, UST, formerly known as the Glowing Goldies, will now carry the moniker Growling Tigers. De La Salle University, declared champion by the Basketball Association of the Philippines (BAP) headed by president Lito Puyat, will have a new coach Gabby Velasco, who will replaced Derrick Pumaren. Far Eastern University, the UAAP board's recognized champion, lost the services of power forward Victor Pablo from graduation.

Team standings

The Adamson Falcons of coach Orly Bauzon, clinch the first finals berth by way of superior quotient, this was made possible by FEU's 87–76 win over UST in their final elimination assignment in which the last three minutes and forty-seven seconds of the game were replayed due to a brownout at the venue.

The FEU Tamaraws advance to the championship against Adamson Falcons by defeating De La Salle Green Archers, 101–87, in a playoff. The Tamaraws, coach by Alfredo Amador, scored a two-game sweep over the Falcons to retain the senior's basketball title.

Second seed playoff

Finals

See also
NCAA Season 68 basketball tournaments

References

55
1992 in Philippine basketball